The Municipality of Žužemberk is a municipality southeast of the capital of Ljubljana in southeastern Slovenia. Its seat is the town of Žužemberk. The area is part of the traditional region of Lower Carniola. The municipality is now included in the Southeast Slovenia Statistical Region.

Settlements
In addition to the municipal seat of Žužemberk, the municipality also includes the following settlements:

 Boršt pri Dvoru
 Brezova Reber pri Dvoru
 Budganja Vas
 Dešeča Vas
 Dolnji Ajdovec
 Dolnji Kot
 Dolnji Križ
 Drašča Vas
 Dvor
 Gornji Ajdovec
 Gornji Kot
 Gornji Križ
 Gradenc
 Hinje
 Hrib pri Hinjah
 Jama pri Dvoru
 Klečet
 Klopce
 Lašče
 Lazina
 Lopata
 Mačkovec pri Dvoru
 Mali Lipovec
 Malo Lipje
 Pleš
 Plešivica
 Podgozd
 Podlipa
 Poljane pri Žužemberku
 Prapreče
 Prevole
 Ratje
 Reber
 Sadinja Vas pri Dvoru
 Sela pri Ajdovcu
 Sela pri Hinjah
 Šmihel pri Žužemberku
 Srednji Lipovec
 Stavča Vas
 Trebča Vas
 Veliki Lipovec
 Veliko Lipje
 Vinkov Vrh
 Visejec
 Vrh pri Hinjah
 Vrh pri Križu
 Vrhovo pri Žužemberku
 Zafara
 Zalisec
 Žvirče

References

External links
 
 Žužemberk municipal site
 Municipality of Žužemberk at Geopedia

Žužemberk
1998 establishments in Slovenia